Bion 5, or also Kosmos 1129 (in Russian: Бион 5, Космос-1129) was a Bion satellite. It was a biomedical research mission involving scientists from nine countries, launched on 29 September 1979, at 15:30:00 UTC. Among the experiments was the first attempt to breed mammals in space, which proved unsuccessful. The mission ended after 18.5 days, on 14 October 1979, at 02:24 UTC. The mission had the cooperation of the Bulgaria, Czechoslovakia, East Germany, France, Hungary, Poland, Romania, the United States and the Soviet Union.

Mission 
Organisms studied included:
 Rattus norvegicus (Wistar rat)
 Coturnix coturnix (Japanese quail)
 Daucus carota (carrot)

Objectives 
Bion 5 mission consisted of various biological studies, including the first mammalian reproduction attempts (rats) in space, which ended up not succeeding. Experiences NASA were designed to study the effects of radiation on mice, quail embryos and some plant specimens.

Studies on the effect of microgravity were also performed on the muscles and bones of rats and avian embryogenesis was studied in space. the effects of microgravity on plant tissues were investigated using carrots and carrot cancerous tissue to study the effects of space flight on the growth and development of plants. As in the previous mission, 30 rats for the species Rattus norvegicus were sent physiological studies; Seven additional rats were used in embryological experiments.

See also 

 1979 in spaceflight

References

Bibliography 
 Kozlov, D. I. (1996), Mashnostroenie, ed.; Konstruirovanie avtomaticheskikh kosmicheskikh apparatov, Moscow, ISBN
 Melnik, T. G. (1997), Nauka, ed.; Voenno-Kosmicheskiy Sili, Moscow, ISBN
 "Bion' nuzhen lyudyam", Novosti Kosmonavtiki, (6): 35, 1996

External links 
 Cosmos 1129. NASA

Bion satellites
Kosmos satellites
Spacecraft launched in 1979
1979 in spaceflight
1979 in the Soviet Union
Czechoslovakia–Soviet Union relations
Romania–Soviet Union relations
Hungary–Soviet Union relations
Poland–Soviet Union relations
France–Soviet Union relations
Soviet Union–United States relations
East Germany–Soviet Union relations